Bosnia and Herzegovina cuisine is balanced between Western and Eastern influences. The food is closely related to former Yugoslav, Middle Eastern, Mediterranean, Austo-Hungarian and other Balkan cuisines.

Ingredients
Bosnian cuisine uses many spices, but usually in moderate quantities. Most dishes are light, as they are cooked in lots of water; the sauces are fully natural, consisting of little more than the natural juices of the vegetables in the dish. Typical ingredients include tomatoes, potatoes, onions, garlic, bell peppers, cucumbers, carrots, cabbage, mushrooms, spinach, courgette, dried and fresh beans, plums, milk, paprika and cream called pavlaka and kajmak. Typical meat dishes include primarily beef and lamb due to Islamic dietary laws, although the Bosnian Croats and Bosnian Serbs can consume pork. Some local specialties are ćevapi, burek (börek), dolma, sarma, pilav (pilaf), gulaš (goulash), ajvar and a whole range of Eastern sweets. The best local wines come from Herzegovina where the climate is suitable for growing grapes. Plum or apple rakija, is produced in Bosnia.

Meat dishes

 Ćevapi – Bosnian kebabs: small grilled minced meat links made of lamb and beef mix; served with onions, kajmak, ajvar and Bosnian pita bread (somun)
 Pljeskavica – a patty dish
 Begova Čorba (Bey's Stew) – a popular Bosnian soup (chorba) made of meat and vegetables
 Filovane paprike or punjena paprika – fried bell peppers stuffed with minced meat
 Sogan-dolma – onions stuffed with minced meat
 Popara – bread soaked in boiling milk or water and spread with kajmak
 Ćufte – meatballs
 Meat under sač (meso ispod sača) – a traditional way of cooking lamb, veal, or goat under a metal, ceramic, or earthenware lid on which hot coals and ashes are heaped
 Pilav (pilaf) – grain, such as rice or cracked wheat, browned in oil, and then cooked in a seasoned broth
 Burek – a meat-filled flaky pastry, traditionally rolled in a spiral and cut into sections for serving. The same dish filled with cottage cheese is called sirnica, one with spinach and cheese zeljanica, one with squash/zucchini called tikvenjača, and one with potatoes krompiruša. All these varieties are generically referred to as pita (Bosnian for "pie").
 Sarma – meat and rice rolled in pickled cabbage leaves
 Raštika – meat and rice rolled in kale leaves
 Grah – a traditional bean stew with meat
 Japrak – grape leaves stuffed with meat and rice
 Musaka – a baked dish made of layers of potatoes (or cabbage or egg plant)and minced beef
 Bosanski Lonac – Bosnian meat stew cooked over an open fire
 Tarhana – typical Bosnian soup with homemade pasta
 Sudžuk – (Sujuk) – spicy beef sausage
 Suho meso – air-dried meat similar to Italian bresaola
 Dolma – stuffed grape leaves with rice
 Visočka pečenica – meat dish from Visoko

Vegetable dishes
 Đuveč – vegetable stew, similar to the Romanian ghiveci and  Bulgarian gjuvec
 Grašak – pea stew
 Kačamak – a traditional Bosnian dish made of cornmeal and potatoes
 Kljukuša – grated potatoes mixed with flour and water and baked in an oven; a traditional dish in the region of Bosanska Krajina
 Sataraš – a dish made with bell peppers, eggplants, onions and tomatoes
 Turšija – pickled vegetables
 Buranija – green beans soup. Can be cooked with meat and sometimes served with kajmak.
 Bamija

Appetizers
 Meze – an assortment of meats, vegetables, or other small dishes served before a meal

Cheeses

 Livno cheese – a dry yellow cheese from the west Bosnian town of Livno and surrounding villages
 Tešanjski– made from the nettle and milk, originates in the Tešanj district in northern central Bosnia and Herzegovina
 Travnički – a white feta-like cheese from the Travnik district in central Bosnia and Herzegovina
 Vlašićki – a highland cheese similar in its salty taste to Travnički, originates in the villages on Vlašić Mountain in central Bosnia and Herzegovina
 Suhi sir – a smoked cheese derived from posni sir
 Kajmak – a Turkish creamy dairy product, similar to clotted cream
 Pavlaka – a soured cream product like crème fraîche

Desserts

Baklava
Halva
Hurmašica – date-shaped pastry drenched in a sweet syrup
Jabukovača – pastry made of filo dough stuffed with apples
Kadaif
Krofna – filled doughnut
Krempita
Oblatna
Orašnica
Palačinka (crêpe)
Pekmez
Rahatlokum (Turkish delight)
Ružica – similar to baklava, but baked in a small roll with raisins
Ruske Kape (trans. Russian Caps, plural)
Šampita – a whipped marshmallow-type dessert with fillo dough crust
Sutlijaš (rice pudding)
Tufahija – whole stewed apple stuffed with a walnut filling
Tulumba – deep-fried dough sweetened with syrup

Relishes, seasoning and bread
 Ajvar
 Vegeta
 Somun and Ramadan somun (with Ćurokot seeds).
 Pogača
 Djevrek
 Lepinja
 Uštipci

Alcoholic beverages
Wines are produced mainly in Herzegovina, in the regions of Mostar, Čitluk, Ljubuški, Stolac, Domanovići, and Međugorje.
 Medovina
 Kruškovac
 Pelinkovac
 Rakija
 Blatina
 Žilavka
 Local spirits are distilled from plums, pears, or grapes, with alcohol content of 45% and higher.
 Šljivovica (plum brandy)

Non-alcoholic beverages

 Boza
 Salep
 Ajran
 Bosnian coffee
 Šerbe
 Elder juice

Kitchenware
 Sač

Gallery

References

Further reading
 Tim Clancy, Bosnia & Herzegovina, The Bradt Travel Guide, 2004, pp. 93–97, 
 

Mediterranean cuisine
Balkan cuisine